Vitek, Vítek or Vítková may refer to:

People with the surname 
Vítek, feminine Vítková, is a Czech surname. Notable bearers include:
 Jack Vitek, American educator
 Jaroslav Vítek, Czech athlete
 John Vitek (1907–1989), American politician
 Miroslav Vítek, Czech athlete
 Olga Vitek, biostatistician and computer scientist
 Pavel Vítek (born 1962), Czech singer and actor
 Petra Vítková, Czech handballer
 Veronika Vítková, Czech biathlete
 Zdeněk Vítek (born 1977), Czech biathlete

People with the given name 
Vitek is a Slavic given name cognate to Vitomir. Notable people with the name include:
 Vitek Tracz, London-based entrepreneur of Polish origin
 Vítek Vaněček, Czech ice hockey player
 Vitek Kieltyka, Polish musician

See also 
 30253 Vítek, main-belt asteroid

Czech-language surnames